341 was a common year starting on Thursday of the Julian calendar.

341 may also refer to:

 341 (number), sum of seven consecutive primes
 341 BC, a year of the pre-Julian Roman calendar
 341st Bombardment Squadron, an inactive United States Air Force unit
 341st Fighter Squadron, an inactive United States Air Force unit
 341st Missile Wing, an intercontinental ballistic missile unit headquartered at Malmstrom Air Force Base, Montana
 U.S. Route 341, a 224-mile-long (360 km) U.S. highway entirely in the U.S. state of Georgia
 National Highway 341 (India), a road in India